Donji Skugrić  is a village in the municipalities of Modriča (Republika Srpska) and Gradačac, Bosnia and Herzegovina. Donji means lower, so there is an upper one as well, Skugrić Gornji.

Demographics 
According to the 2013 census, its population was 991, with 937 of them living in the Modriča part and 54 in the Gradačac part.

References

Populated places in Gradačac
Populated places in Modriča